Millersburg is an unincorporated community in Forest Township, Rice County, Minnesota, United States.

The community is located along Rice County Road 1 (Millersburg Boulevard) near its junction with Chester Avenue. Nearby places include Lonsdale, Faribault, Northfield, and Dundas.

ZIP codes 55046 (Lonsdale), 55021 (Faribault), 55057 (Northfield), and 55019 (Dundas) all meet near Millersburg.

Millersburg was laid out in 1857 by George W. Miller, and named for him.

References

Unincorporated communities in Minnesota
Unincorporated communities in Rice County, Minnesota
1857 establishments in Minnesota Territory
Populated places established in 1857